, or Parece Vela, is a coral reef with two rocks enlarged with tetrapod-cement structures. Its dry land area is mostly made up by three concrete encasings and there is a  stilt platform in the lagoon housing a research station. There is a third completely artificial tetrapod-cement islet. The atoll is the southernmost part of Japan and the only Japanese territory south of the Tropic of Cancer.

Japan argues that the atoll is significant enough for it to claim a  exclusive economic zone (EEZ) around it, but China, South Korea, and Taiwan dispute the Japanese EEZ, saying that the atoll does not meet the definition of an island under the United Nations Convention on the Law of the Sea.

History
The atoll may have been sighted first by Spanish sailor Bernardo de la Torre in 1543, although the first undisputed sighting was by Miguel López de Legazpi in 1565. Its first recorded name was Parece Vela (Spanish for "looks like a sail", alluding to the original appearance of the reef). This name has been retained in English as well, especially to designate the geological formations of the islets.

In 1789, Captain William Douglas arrived with the British ship Iphigenia and, in 1790, the place was named Douglas Reef (also spelled Douglass Reef). This name continues to appear in modern sources. In 1796, what was likely the reef was then re-discovered by the brig Nautilus, under the command of Captain Charles Bishop, and the name Nautilus Rocks has appeared in some sources.

The existence of the atoll might not have been known by the Japanese until 1888. In 1922 and 1925, the Japanese navy ship Manshu investigated the area. In 1931, confirming that no other countries had claimed the reefs, Japan declared it Japanese territory, placing it under the jurisdiction of the Tokyo Metropolis, classifying it as part of the Ogasawara Village, and naming it Okinotorishima, meaning "remote bird islands". English names derived from the Japanese include Okinotori coral reefs and Okinotori Islands.

During 1939 and 1941, a foundation was completed for a lighthouse and a meteorological observation site, but construction was interrupted by the outbreak of World War II. After Japan's defeat, the United States assumed sovereignty over the Ogasawara islands, and returned authority over the islands to Japan in 1968.

Between 1987 and 1993 the government of Tokyo and later the central government built steel breakwaters and concrete walls to stop the erosion of Okinotorishima, which today leaves only three of the five rocks that were present in 1939 above water; in 1988 the Japan Marine Science and Technology Center built a marine investigation facility which it has since maintained following typhoon damage. Funding for full repairs was finally allocated in early 2016. The facility also doubles as an EEZ observation post for the Maritime Bureau of the Ministry of Land, Infrastructure, Transport and Tourism, being equipped with radar and various other sensors to help monitor activity in the zone.

On March 16, 2007, a light beacon was installed by the Japan Coast Guard. The beacon is plotted on the hydrographic chart.

Geology

Geologically, the islets are a coral atoll, built on the Kyushu–Palau Ridge, the westernmost part of the Izu–Bonin–Mariana Arc system. The name Parece Vela Basin has been given to the extinct back-arc basin that lies immediately to the east (the northern half of this back-arc basin is known as the Shikoku Basin). This back-arc basin was formed by seafloor spreading between the late Oligocene and Miocene. The Parece Vela Basin contains the longest megamullion in the world. The original Spanish name of the islets is normally used for the geological formations, hence, Parece Vela megamullion, Parece Vela ridge, Parece Vela Rift or Parece Vela basin.

The waters around the reefs are potentially rich in oil and other mineral and fisheries resources and it lies in an area of potential military significance.

The area has three tiny individual islets:
Higashi-Kojima (東小島, "Eastern Islet")
Kita-Kojima (北小島, "Northern Islet"), nevertheless rather in the "West"
Minami-Kojima (南小島, "Southern Islet")

Minami-Kojima is a completely artificial islet created in shallow water. But also the two original islets appear completely artificial today, with little if any trace of the two natural rocks that still appear on photographs of 1987. In 1925, there were still five above-water rocks, which have eroded since. A report from 1947 mentions five above-water rocks. Three smaller ones were on the west side, nearly impossible to see from seaward because of the breaking waves. The original rocks appeared barren, without any terrestrial vegetation. The current artificial dry land areas with their concrete surfaces appear unfit to support terrestrial vegetation either.

The platform has a helicopter landing pad and a large three-story building with a marine investigation facility and a meteorological station.

The lagoon is 3 to 4.6 meters deep, but there are numerous coral heads of lesser depths throughout the area. The fringing reef of the atoll is pear-shaped in an east–west direction with its greatest width at the eastern end.

Administration
Administratively, the island is considered part of Ogasawara village, Tokyo. In 1939, the construction of a naval base was started by Japan, but suspended in 1941, at the start of the Pacific War.

Typhoons are constant threats to Okinotori's existence. In the 1970s there were about five or six visible protrusions, but by 1989, only two were visible.

In order to prevent the island from submersion caused by erosion and maintain its claim to the EEZ, the Japanese government launched an embankment building project in 1987, and Higashikojima and Kitakojima were surrounded by concrete. Japan has encased the reefs with $280 million worth of concrete and covered the smaller one with a $50 million titanium net to shield it from debris thrown up by the ocean's waves. The Japanese government has spent over $600 million fortifying the reefs to prevent them from being completely washed away.

Furthermore, the Nippon Foundation has drawn plans to build a lighthouse and increase the size of the reef by breeding microorganisms known as foraminifera. Creating land using the microorganisms could take decades to a century before the island is large enough to be useful.

Currently, Japan carries out maritime research and observation of the area, as well as repair work on the embankment.

In 2005, the government installed a radar system (at the cost of ¥ 330 million), repaired a heliport, and placed an official address plaque saying, "1 Okinotori Island, Ogasawara Village, Tokyo" in Japanese. Fishing expeditions also support the claim of economic activity.

Former Tokyo Governor Shintaro Ishihara has talked of building a power station, despite protests by environmentalists. His government has helped fund expeditions to Okinotori by Japanese fishermen and scientists. Governor Ishihara himself toured the islands on May 20, 2005 to inspect the conservation and management efforts, went snorkeling to see firsthand the condition of the surrounding waters, and released Japanese horse mackerel fry to show support for the local fishing industry. The islands are an intermittent rallying point for Japanese nationalists, and, as such, a hot-button political issue in Japan.

EEZ dispute

In 1988, Jon van Dyke, a law professor at the University of Hawaii, challenged whether Okinotorishima met the requirements for establishing an exclusive economic zone (EEZ): "Article 121(3) of the 1982 Law of the Sea Convention, which Japan has signed, states that Rocks which cannot sustain human habitation or economic life of their own shall have no exclusive economic zone or continental shelf. Okinotorishima - which consists of two eroding protrusions no larger than king-size beds - certainly meets the description of an uninhabitable rock that cannot sustain economic life of its own. It is not, therefore, entitled to generate a 200-mile exclusive economic zone. The Law of the Sea Convention is also quite clear - in Article 60 (8) -that artificially built islands do not generate 200-mile resource zones. The more than $200 million the Japanese are spending to construct what is in essence an artificial island cannot, therefore, be the basis for a claim to the exclusive control over the resources in the waters around such a construction."

On 22 April 2004, Chinese diplomats stated during bilateral talks with Japan that they regarded Okinotorishima as an atoll, not an islet, and did not acknowledge Japan's claim to an EEZ stemming from Okinotorishima.

Under the United Nations Convention on the Law of the Sea, an island is "a naturally formed area of land, surrounded by water, which is above water at high tide". It states that "rocks which cannot sustain human habitation or economic life of their own shall have no exclusive economic zone." Japan signed the Convention in 1983; the Convention came into force in 1994–1996 for Japan.

Japan claims an EEZ over 400,000 square km (154,500 square miles) around Okinotorishima. China and South Korea dispute this claim in their addenda to the CLCS, saying the area only consists of rocks and not islands. Neither China nor South Korea have territorial claims regarding Okinotorishima, but foreign policy analysts speculated that they want to "investigate the surrounding seabed for submarine operations in case of military conflict involving the Republic of China (Taiwan)." Japan claims that rock is not defined in the convention. The construction of a port, lighthouse, and power station may be used as a counterargument for China's claim regarding "sustain[ing] human habitation or economic life", but the UNCLOS definition for an island per Art. 121(3) also requires one to have its own natural source of freshwater as a prerequisite to sustaining human habitation or economic life, which is absent on Okinotorishima.

The territory lies at a militarily strategic point, midway between Taiwan and Guam, the latter where U.S. forces are based. Vessels of the PRC are believed to have been mapping the ocean's bottom over which U.S. warships might pass on their way to Taiwan. The PRC conducted four maritime surveys near the Okinotori coral reefs in 2001, two in 2002, and one in 2003. However, the number of such incidents rose to four in 2004. These incidents have drawn protests from Japan.

Jon Van Dyke, a law professor, has suggested that the situation is similar to the failed British attempt to claim an EEZ around Rockall, an uninhabited granite outcropping in the Atlantic Ocean. The UK eventually dropped its claim in the 1990s when other countries objected. Dr. Dyke has further asserted that it is impossible to make "a plausible claim that Okinotorishima should be able to generate a 200 [nautical]-mile zone". Tadao Kuribayashi, another law professor, disagrees, arguing in part that rocks and reefs differ in composition and structure, and that the intent of the provision was geared toward the former.

In 2016, Japan's arrest of a Taiwanese fishing ship's crew led Taiwan to protest against Japan's claim of island status for Okinotori and by extension the EEZ.

See also

Scarborough Shoal, another larger shoal with two skerries
Hateruma
Geography of Japan
Japanese Archipelago
List of extreme points of Japan
Territorial disputes of Japan
Desert island
List of islands
Farallon de Pajaros

References

External links

Page with overhead photograph of the entire atoll
report about appearance in 1947 (under the name Parece Vela/Douglas Reef)
close-up photo of Higashikojima (東小島, "Eastern Islet")
page with photograph of platform
Italian page with history in English and oblique aerial photograph of Okinotori from southwest
detailed satellite images
Japanese map
Tokyo governor stirs reef dispute
Related treaties
Treaty of San Francisco
Agreement between Japan and the United States of America Concerning Nanpo Shoto and Other Islands (1968)
"United States Treaties and Other International Agreements VOLUME 19 IN SIX PARTS Part 4 1968" P.4895-

Coral reefs
Disputed waters
Extreme points of Japan
Islands of Tokyo
Atolls of Japan
Uninhabited islands of Japan
Japan Coast Guard